Libav is an abandoned free software project, forked from FFmpeg in 2011, that contains libraries and programs for handling multimedia data.

History

Fork from FFmpeg 
The Libav project was a fork of the FFmpeg project. It was announced on March 13, 2011 by a group of FFmpeg developers. The event was related to an issue in project management and different goals: FFmpeg supporters wanted to keep development velocity in favour of more features, while Libav supporters and developers wanted to improve the state of the code and take the time to design better APIs.

The maintainer of the FFmpeg packages for Debian and Ubuntu, being one of the group of developers who forked FFmpeg, switched the packages to this fork in 2011. Hence, most software on these systems that depended on FFmpeg automatically switched to Libav. On July 8, 2015, Debian announced it would return to FFmpeg for various, technical reasons. Several arguments justified this step. Firstly, FFmpeg had a better record of responding to vulnerabilities than Libav. Secondly, Mateusz "j00ru" Jurczyk, a security-oriented developer at Google, argued that all issues he found in FFmpeg were fixed in a timely manner, while Libav was still affected by various bugs. Finally, FFmpeg supported a far wider variety of codecs and containers than Libav.

 Libav is an abandoned software project, with Libav developers either returning to FFmpeg, moving to other multimedia projects like the AV1 video codec, or leaving the multimedia field entirely.

Confusion 

At the beginning of this fork, Libav and FFmpeg separately developed their own versions of the ffmpeg command. Libav then renamed their ffmpeg to avconv to distance themselves from the FFmpeg project. During the transition period, when a Libav user typed ffmpeg, there was a message telling the user that the ffmpeg command was deprecated and avconv has to be used instead. This confused some users into thinking that FFmpeg (the project) was dead.

This message was removed upstream when ffmpeg was finally removed from the Libav sources. In June 2012, on Ubuntu 12.04, the message was re-worded, but that new "deprecated" message caused even more user confusion. Starting with Ubuntu 15.04 "Vivid", FFmpeg's ffmpeg is back in the repositories again.

To further complicate matters, Libav chose a name that was used by FFmpeg to refer to its libraries (libavcodec, libavformat, etc.). For example, the libav-user mailing list, for questions and discussions about using the FFmpeg libraries, is unrelated to the Libav project.

Software using Libav instead of FFmpeg 
Debian followed Libav when it was announced, and announced it would return to FFmpeg for Debian Stretch (9.0).

MPlayer2, a defunct fork of MPlayer, used Libav exclusively, but could be used with GStreamer with its public API. The MPV media player no longer supports Libav due to missing API changes.

Legal aspects

Codecs 

Libav contains more than 100 codecs. Many codecs that compress information have been claimed by patent holders. Such claims may be enforceable in countries like the United States which have implemented software patents, but are considered unenforceable or void in countries that have not implemented software patents.

Logo 

The Libav logo uses a zigzag pattern that references how MPEG video codecs handle entropy encoding. It was previously the logo of the FFmpeg project until Libav was forked from it. Following the fork, in 2011 one of the Libav developers Måns Rullgård claimed copyright over the logo and requested FFmpeg cease and desist from using it. FFmpeg subsequently altered their logo into a 3D version.

Google Summer of Code participation 
Libav participated in the Google Summer of Code program in 2011 and 2012.

With participation in the Google Summer of Code, Libav has had many new features and improvements developed, including a WMVP/WVP2 decoder, hardware accelerated H.264 decoding on Android, and G.723.1 codec support.

Technical details

Components 
Libav primarily consists of libavcodec, which is an audio/video codec library used by several other projects, libavformat, which is an audio/video container muxing and demuxing library, and avconv, which is a multimedia manipulation tool similar to FFmpeg's ffmpeg or Gstreamer gst-launch-1.0 command.

The command line-programs:
avconv  A video and audio converter that can also grab from a live audio/video source.
avserver  A streaming server for both audio and video.
avplay  A very simple and portable media player using the Libav libraries and the SDL library.
avprobe  Gathers information from multimedia streams and prints it in human- and machine-readable fashion.
The libraries:
libavcodec  A library containing all the Libav audio/video encoders and decoders.
libavfilter  The substitute for vhook which allows the video/audio to be modified or examined between the decoder and the encoder.
libavformat  A library containing demuxers and muxers for audio and video container formats.
libavresample  A library containing audio resampling routines.
libavutil  A helper library containing routines common to different parts of Libav.

This library includes Adler-32, CRC, MD5, SHA-1, LZO decompressor, Base64 encoder/decoder, DES encrypter/decrypter, RC4 encrypter/decrypter and AES encrypter/decrypter.
libswscale  A library containing video image scaling and colorspace/pixelformat conversion routines.

Contained codecs 
Numerous free and open-source implementations of existing algorithms for the (usually lossy) compression and decompression of audio or video data, called codecs, are available. Please note that an algorithm can be subject to patent law in some jurisdictions. Here are lists of the ones contained in the libav library:

Video codecs 
Libav includes video decoders and/or encoders for the following formats:

 Adobe Flash Player related video codecs: Screen video, Screen video 2, Sorenson 3 Codec, VP6 and Flash Video (FLV)
 Asus v1
 Asus v2
 AVS (decoding only)
 CamStudio (decoding only)
 Cinepak (decoding only)
 Creative YUV (CYUV, decoding only)
 Dirac (via libschroedinger)
 DNxHD
 Duck TrueMotion v1 (decoding only)
 Duck TrueMotion v2 (decoding only)
 Flash Screen Video
 FFV1
 ITU-T video standards: H.261, H.262/MPEG-2 Part 2, H.263 and H.264/MPEG-4 AVC
 H.263
 H.264/MPEG-4 AVC (native decoder, encoding through x264)
 H.265/HEVC since 2014-02-12
 Huffyuv
 id Software RoQ Video
 Intel Indeo (decoding only)
 ISO/IEC/ITU-T JPEG image standards: JPEG, JPEG-LS and JPEG 2000
 Lagarith (decoding only)
 LOCO (decoding only)
 DVD Forum standards related / Dolby audio codecs: MLP (a.k.a. TrueHD) and AC-3
 Mimic (decoding only)
 MJPEG
 MPEG-1
 MPEG-2/H.262
 ISO/IEC MPEG video standards: MPEG-1 Part 2, H.262/MPEG-2 Part 2, MPEG-4 Part 2 and H.264/MPEG-4 AVC

 MPEG-4 Part 2 (the format used for example by the popular DivX and Xvid codecs)
 On2 VP8 (native decoder, encoding through libvpx)
 On2: Duck TrueMotion 1, Duck TrueMotion 2, VP3, VP5, VP6 and VP8
 Apple ProRes
 Apple Computer QuickDraw (decoding only)
 QuickTime related video codecs: Cinepak, Motion JPEG, ProRes, Sorenson 3 Codec, Animation codec (RLE), Apple Video (RPZA), Graphics Codec (SMC)
 RAD Game Tools: Smacker video and Bink video
 RenderWare: TXD
 RealVideo RV10 and RV20
 RealVideo RV30 and RV40 (decoding only)
 RealPlayer related video codecs: RealVideo 1, 2, 3 and 4
 VC-1 (decoding only)
 Smacker video (decoding only)
 Sorenson SVQ1
 Sorenson SVQ3 (decoding only)
 Theora (native decoder, encoding through libtheora)
 Sierra VMD Video (decoding only)
 VMware VMnc (decoding only)
 Westwood Studios VQA (decoding only)
 Windows Media Player related video codecs: Microsoft RLE, Microsoft Video 1, Cinepak, Indeo 2, 3 and 5, Motion JPEG, Microsoft MPEG-4 v1, v2 and v3, WMV1, WMV2 and WMV3 (a.k.a. VC-1)
 SMPTE video standards: VC-1 (a.k.a. WMV3), VC-2 (a.k.a. Dirac), VC-3 (a.k.a. AVID DNxHD) and DPX image
 Wing Commander/Xan Video (decoding only)

Audio codecs 
Libav includes decoders and encoders for the following formats:

 8SVX (decoding only)
 Adobe Flash Player related audio codecs: Adobe SWF ADPCM and Nellymoser Asao
 AAC
 AC-3
 3GPP vocoder standards: AMR-NB, AMR-WB (a.k.a. G.722.2)
 ITU-T vocoder standards: G.711 μ-law, G.711 A-law, G.721 (a.k.a. G.726 32k), G.722, G.722.2 (a.k.a. AMR-WB), G.723 (a.k.a. G.726 24k and 40k), G.723.1, G.726, G.729 and G.729D
 Apple Lossless
 ATRAC3 (decoding only)
 Cook Codec (decoding only)
 DTS (encoder is highly experimental)
 EA ADPCM (decoding only)
 E-AC-3
 FLAC (24/32 bit support for decoding only)
 GSM 06.10 (native decoder, encoding through libgsm)
 GSM related voice codecs: Full Rate
 Intel Music Coder (decoding only)
 Meridian Lossless Packing / Dolby TrueHD (decoding only)
 Monkey's Audio (decoding only)
 MP2
 MP3 (native decoder, encoding through LAME)
 ISO/IEC MPEG audio standards: MP1, MP2, MP3, AAC, HE-AAC and MPEG-4 ALS
 Nellymoser Asao Codec in Flash

 NTT: TwinVQ
 Opus (via libopus)
 QCELP (decoding only)
 QDM2 (decoding only)
 QuickTime related audio codecs: QDesign Music Codec 2 and ALAC
 RealAudio 1.0
 RealAudio 2.0 (decoding only)
 RealPlayer related audio codecs: RealAudio 3, 6, 7, 8, 9 and 10 (a.k.a. ralf for RealAudioLosslessFormat)
 RealPlayer related voice codecs: RealAudio 1, 2 (variant of G.728), 4 and 5
 Shorten (decoding only)
 SMPTE audio standards: SMPTE 302M
 Sony: ATRAC1 and ATRAC3
 Speex (via libspeex)
 Truespeech
 TTA (decoding only)
 TwinVQ (decoding only)
 Vorbis
 WavPack (decoding only)
 Windows Media Audio 1
 Windows Media Audio 2
 Windows Media Audio 9 Professional (decoding only)
 Windows Media Audio Voice (decoding only)
 Windows Media Player related audio codecs: WMA1, WMA2, WMA Pro, and WMA Lossless
 Windows Media Player related voice codecs: WMA Voice and MS-GSM

Supported file formats 
Additionally to the aforementioned codecs, Libav also supports several file formats (file formats designed to contain audio and/or video data and subtitles, are called "containers", but that is just a special denomination.):

 ASF
 AVI and also input from AviSynth
 BFI
 CAF
 FLV
 GXF, General eXchange Format, SMPTE 360M
 IFF
 RL2
 ISO base media file format (including QuickTime, 3GP and MP4)
 Matroska (including WebM)
 Maxis XA
 MPEG program stream

 MPEG transport stream (including AVCHD)
 MXF, Material eXchange Format, SMPTE 377M
 MSN Webcam stream
 NUT
 NUV (MythTV NuppelVideo file format)
 Ogg
 OMA
 TXD
 WTV
 WebP

Supported protocols 
Support for several communications protocols is also contained in Libav. Here is a list:
 IETF standards: TCP, UDP, Gopher, HTTP, RTP, RTSP and SDP
 Apple related protocols: HTTP Live Streaming
 RealMedia related protocols: RealMedia RTSP/RDT
 Adobe related protocols: RTMP, RTMPT (via librtmp), RTMPE (via librtmp), RTMPTE (via librtmp) and RTMPS (via librtmp)
 Microsoft related protocols: MMS over TCP and MMS over HTTP

See also 

 VLC media player uses libavcodec as its codec base, adds other codecs, cross platform
 Open source codecs and containers

References

External links 
 

C (programming language) libraries
Cross-platform free software
Free codecs
Free computer libraries
Free music software
Free software programmed in C
Free video conversion software
Multimedia frameworks
Video libraries
Software that uses FFmpeg